L'Italiano was a  weekly literary and arts magazine that existed between 1926 and 1942 in Italy. It full title was L'italiano: rivista settimanale della gente fascista. It is one of the magazines founded and edited by well-known Italian journalist Leo Longanesi. Its subtitle was Foglio della Rivoluzione Fascista (Italian: Publication of the Fascist Revolution in English), and the motto of the magazine was "Mussolini is always right" which was also adopted and employed by the Fascist regime.

History and profile
L'Italiano was established by Leo Longanesi in Bologna in 1926. The first issue appeared on 14 January. In the initial period it was published on a biweekly basis, and the first eight issues heavily covered political writings. From 1927 the publisher was L'Italiano Editore which Longanesi founded the same year. The headquarters of L'Italiano was moved by Longanesi to Rome. The magazine ceased publication at the end of 1942.

References

1926 establishments in Italy
1942 disestablishments in Italy
Biweekly magazines published in Italy
Defunct literary magazines published in Italy
Defunct political magazines published in Italy
Fascist newspapers and magazines
Italian-language magazines
Magazines established in 1926
Magazines disestablished in 1942
Magazines published in Rome
Mass media in Bologna
Weekly magazines published in Italy